Roger Jean Henri Motz (8 July 1904 – 27 March 1964) was a Belgian liberal politician. Motz was a mine-engineer and governor of companies. He was municipality council member and a member of parliament for Brussels and as from 1946 senator.

After World War II  he was from 1945 up to 1953 President of the Liberal Party and once again of 1958 up to 1961 in run-up to the transformation of the liberal party to the PVV. From 1952 up to 1958 he was President of the Liberal International. He was also President of the Belgian League for European Cooperation.

Sources
 Presidents of the Belgian liberal party
 Roger Motz
 Roger Motz (in French)

1904 births
1964 deaths

Belgian Ministers of State
Belgian people in the United Kingdom during World War II
People from Schaerbeek
Presidents of the Liberal International